Nonacris was an ancient Greek town in the region of Pheneus

Nonacris may also refer to:

Nonacris (Orchomenus), an ancient Greek town in the region of Orchomenus
Nonacris (mythology), the wife of king Lycaon of Arcadia in Greek mythology
Nonacris (fly), a genus of flies in the family Stratiomyidae